5542 Moffatt, provisional designation , is a Marian asteroid from the central regions of the asteroid belt, approximately  in diameter. It was discovered on 6 August 1978, by astronomers at the Perth Observatory in Bickley, Australia. The likely S-type asteroid has a rotation period of 5.19 hours. It was named for Australian Ethelwin Moffatt, a benefactor of the discovering observatory.

Orbit and classification 

Moffatt is a core member of the Maria family, a large intermediate belt family of stony asteroids. Alternatively, it has also been assigned to the stony Eunomia family, one of the most prominent families in the intermediate main belt with more than 5,000 members.

It orbits the Sun in the central main-belt at a distance of 2.2–3.0 AU once every 4 years and 2 months (1,520 days; semi-major axis of 2.59 AU). Its orbit has an eccentricity of 0.16 and an inclination of 16° with respect to the ecliptic. The body's observation arc begins with its first observation at Palomar Observatory in July 1978, a month prior to its official discovery observation at Bickley.

Physical characteristics 

Moffatt is an assumed stony S-type asteroid.

Rotation period 

In November 2011, a rotational lightcurve of Moffatt was obtained from photometric observations by Chinese astronomers using the SARA telescopes  of the Southeastern Association for Research in Astronomy at Kitt Peak and CTIO. Lightcurve analysis gave a rotation period of 5.187 hours and a brightness variation of 0.12 magnitude. This supersedes a previous result from a fragmentary lightcurve by  that gave a period of 5.195 hours with an amplitude of 0.27 magnitude.

Diameter and albedo 

According to the survey carried out by the NEOWISE mission of NASA's Wide-field Infrared Survey Explorer, Moffatt measures 8.597 kilometers in diameter and its surface has a high albedo of 0.345. The Collaborative Asteroid Lightcurve Link assumes an albedo of 0.21 – derived from 15 Eunomia, the parent body of the Eunomia family – and calculates a diameter of 10.06 kilometers based on an absolute magnitude of 12.3.

Naming 

This minor planet was named after Australian Ethelwin Moffatt (née Winzar, born 1926), a benefactor of the discovering Perth Observatory and a direct descendant of John Flamsteed (1646–1719), the first Astronomer Royal. The official naming citation was published by the Minor Planet Center on 2 September 2001.

References

External links 
 Asteroid Lightcurve Database (LCDB), query form (info )
 Dictionary of Minor Planet Names, Google books
 Discovery Circumstances: Numbered Minor Planets (5001)-(10000) – Minor Planet Center
 
 

005542
005542
Named minor planets
19780806